Curling clubs in the Canadian province of Quebec are organized by Curling Quebec into 10 regions.

East
Club de curling de la Vallée - Amqui
Club de curling de Rimouski - Rimouski
Club de curling Murdochville - Murdochville
Club de curling Rivière-du-Loup - Rivière-du-Loup

North Coast
Club de curling Baie-Comeau - Baie-Comeau
Club de curling Forestville - Forestville
Club de curling Sept-Îles - Sept-Îles
Club de curling Port-Cartier - Port-Cartier

Quebec City
Club de curling Nairn - Clermont
Club de curling Etchemin - Saint-Romuald
Club de curling Jacques-Cartier - Sillery
Club de curling Portneuf - Donnacona
Club de curling Thetford - Thetford Mines
Club de curling Victoria - Sainte-Foy
Club de curling les balais verts - Charlesbourg

Mauricie
Club de curling du Cap - Cap-de-la-Madeleine
Club de curling Grand-Mère - Grand-Mère
Club de curling Lanaudière - Notre-Dame-des-Prairies
Club de curling Laviolette - Trois-Rivières
Club de curling Aurèle-Racine - Sorel-Tracy
Club de curling Trois-Rivières - Trois-Rivières
Club de curling La Tuque - La Tuque

Saguenay/Lac Saint Jean
Club de curling Chicoutimi - Chicoutimi
Club de curling Dolbeau - Dolbeau
Club de curling Kénogami - Jonquière
Club de curling Port-Alfred - La Baie
Club de curling Riverbend - Alma
Club de curling Roberval - Roberval
Club de curling Saint-Félicien - Saint-Félicien

Estrie
Border Curling Club - Stanstead
Club Sportif Celanese inc. - Drummondville
Club de curling Cowansville - Cowansville
Club de curling Danville - Danville
Club de curling Laurier - Victoriaville
Lennoxville Curling Club - Lennoxville
Club de curling Magog - Magog
North Hatley Curling Club - North Hatley
Club de curling Sherbrooke - Sherbrooke
Club de curling Sutton - Sutton
Club de curling Windsor - Windsor

Montreal
Baie-d'Urfé Curling Club - Baie-d'Urfé
Club de curling Bel-Aire - Mont-Saint-Hilaire
Club de curling Boucherville - Boucherville
Glenmore Curling Club - Dollard-des-Ormeaux
Hudson Legion Curling Club - Hudson
Whitlock Golf & Country Club - Hudson
Lachine Curling Club - Lachine
Club de curling Laval-sur-le-Lac - Laval-sur-le-Lac
Club de curling Longue-Pointe - Montreal
Mt. Bruno Curling Club - Saint-Bruno
Montreal West Curling Club - Montréal-Ouest
Otterburn Legion Memorial Curling Club - Otterburn Park
Pointe-Claire Curling Club - Pointe-Claire
Rosemère Curling Club - Rosemère
Royal Montreal Curling Club - Montreal
St-Lambert Curling Club - Saint-Lambert
TMR Curling Club - Mont-Royal

Southwest
Club de curling Bedford - Bedford
Club de curling Huntingdon - Huntingdon
Club de curling Lacolle - Lacolle
Club de curling Ormstown - Ormstown
Club de curling Valleyfield - Salaberry-de-Valleyfield

Outaouais
Brownsburg Curling Club - Brownsburg-Chatham
Buckingham Curling Club - Gatineau
Curling des Collines - Chelsea
Club de curling Lachute - Lachute
Club de curling Vallée de la Gatineau (Maniwaki) - Maniwaki
Club de curling Thurso - Thurso
Club de curling Shawville - Shawville
Club de curling Vallée de la rouge - Rivière-Rouge

Northwest
Club de curling Amos - Amos
Club de curling La Sarre - La Sarre
Club de curling Noranda - Rouyn-Noranda
Club de curling Opémiska - Chapais
Club Sports Belvédère - Val-d'Or

 Quebec
 
Curling clubs
Curling in Quebec
Quebec